This is a list of Korean and non-Korean online retailers who sell Korean fashion items. The list does not include websites of Korean fashion brands that sell their products through their own online stores. For a list of major Korean fashion brands, see Fashion in South Korea.

Korean online general retailers 
The following is a list of Korean online retailers, dealing with a wide variety of retail items, including fashion items.

 Kmall24 
 G-Market
 Inter Park

Korean online fashion retailers 
The following is a list of Korean online retailers, selling exclusively fashion items.

 Kakao Style
 Stylenanda

Non-Korean online retailers 
This list includes online fashion retailers which are not located in Korea.

These webpages sell Korean-Fashion, K-Beauty products as well as K-Fashion inspired products.

 YesStyle

See also 
 Fashion in South Korea
 Shopping in Seoul
 List of South Korean retail companies
 List of Korean clothing

Lists of retailers
Online fashion retailers
 
Fashion-related lists
Fashion industry